The Zinza are a Bantu ethnolinguistic group from the southwestern Islands on Lake Victoria, Tanzania. The Zinza people also lived on the shores of Geita Region's Chato District and Geita District  and Mwanza Region. In 1987, the Zinza population was estimated to number 138,000 .

See also
 List of ethnic groups in Tanzania

References
 Rubanza, Yunus (2008). Luzinza: Msamiata Luzinza-Kiswahili-Kiingereza na Kiingereza-Luzinza-Kiswahili / Zinza-English-Swahili and English-Zinza-Swahili Lexicon. .

Ethnic groups in Tanzania